Alexandria Nichole Mills (born February 26, 1992) is an American model and beauty queen who was crowned Miss World 2010 on October 30, 2010, in Sanya, China. Mills is the third woman from the United States to win Miss World.

Early life
Mills, a resident of Shepherdsville, Kentucky, had an interest in modeling at least as early as the eighth grade; following Mills' victory in Miss World 2010, a counselor at her middle school recalled that she had a modeling portfolio even then. The counselor also recalled her as being "very outgoing and very confident", and that Mills had demonstrated fearlessness by volunteering to sing "God Bless America" over the school intercom.
 
Prior to participating in Miss World, 18-year-old Mills was homeschooled for high school, graduating shortly before the competition, and wanted to become a teacher. According to her mother, she also has an interest in landscape photography. A vegetarian, Mills was also a fashion model and was listed with Elite Models agency.

Miss World 2010
Mills was appointed as Miss World America 2010 to represent her country at the 2010 Miss World pageant held in Sanya, China. She placed first runner-up during the Miss World Beach Beauty fast track event held on October 19 and second-runner-up in Miss World Top Model was held on October 23, becoming the eventual winner of Miss World 2010 on October 30.

References

External links

Official Miss World website

1992 births
American beauty pageant winners
Living people
Miss World winners
Miss World 2010 delegates
People from Shepherdsville, Kentucky
Television personalities from Louisville, Kentucky
Kentucky women television personalities
Female models from Kentucky
21st-century American women